Adam VanHo is an attorney in Munroe Falls, Ohio.

A graduate of Euclid High School in Euclid, Ohio, Allegheny College in Meadville, Pennsylvania (B.A.), the Cleveland-Marshall College of Law at Cleveland State University (J.D.), and the Beasley School of Law at Temple University (LL.M). VanHo is President of VanHo Law, an Ohio law firm.

Prior to starting VanHo Law, VanHo served as an assistant prosecuting attorney in Montgomery County, Ohio and Summit County, Ohio.  He was also an Assistant Attorney General in the Ohio Attorney General's Office.  He was also an attorney at the Akron law firm of Burdon and Merlitti.

During his career, VanHo has handled a number of high-profile cases, including the successful trial of Denny Ross, litigation surrounding the attempted execution of Romell Broom, and the case of Akron minister Marc Neal.  He was also counsel on a lawsuit against Ohio Governor John Kasich and the Ohio Department of Natural Resources over fishing regulations that impact Ohio's 1.2 million fishermen/fisherwomen.  VanHo also represented Dewey Jones, an Ohio inmate recently released from prison after almost twenty years.  The story attracted national and international attention after a Summit County judge vacated Jones's conviction following DNA testing on evidence found at the crime scene.  The Ohio Attorney General's Office has since dismissed the charges against him.

VanHo is currently representing former White House Press Secretary and Director of Communications Stephanie Grisham in a lawsuit brought by her ex-boyfriend and Ohio Congressional candidate Max Miller.  In January 2022, he joined over 460 other international diplomats, scholars, human rights and legal experts in calling for a United Nations investigation into the 1988 massacre of political prisoners in Iran.  VanHo is a member of the List of Counsel of the International Criminal Court.

VanHo has previously been the candidate for the Ohio House of Representatives and Judge in Summit County, Ohio.
In 2018, in a heavily gerrymandered district, then-State Representative Kristina Roegner (R-Hudson) beat VanHo in the 27th Senate District.  During the campaign, in addition to a number of other endorsements, VanHo was endorsed by the Ohio Fraternal Order of Police and named a Friend of Agriculture by the Ohio Farm Bureau.

VanHo is married to Tina Merlitti, the former Vice President of Akron City Council and the former President of the Akron Area League of Women Voters.  He currently is Vice Chair of the Munroe Falls, Ohio Planning Commission.  He is also the founder of the Raging River Coffee Company.

References

Year of birth missing (living people)
Living people
People from Akron, Ohio
Ohio lawyers
Allegheny College alumni
Cleveland State University alumni